Long Live the League is the first compilation album by English punk rock band the Anti-Nowhere League. It consists of tracks made up of material from Live in Yugoslavia, We Are... The League and the A & B Sides of the For You/Out on The Wasteland EP.

The only rare track is the version of "On the Waterfront", which differs from the version on The Perfect Crime. This version is more guitar-based and less synth-based, it comes from the same 1984 session that also produced the "Out on the Wasteland" 12" single.

Track listing
"We Are the League"
"Streets of London" (Ralph McTell)
"So What" (Live)
"Let's Break the Law"
 "Ballad of J.J. Decay"
"Woman"
"Snowman"
"’Reck-A-Nowhere"
"Let the Country Feed You" (Live)
"Going Down" ( Live)
"I Hate People"
"For You"
"We Will Survive"
"Out on the Wasteland"
"On the Waterfront"
"Queen and Country"

References

Anti-Nowhere League albums
1985 compilation albums